The surname Rutherford, also Rutherfurd, is a Scottish and Northern English habitational surname deriving from a place in the Scottish borders region near Roxburgh. It is also a given name.

Origin
Rutherford is a Scottish border clan name.  The name comes from a place-name in Roxburghshire on the south bank of the river Tweed, midway between Melrose and Kelso.  A village there, then called Rothersfurth, was burnt and razed by an English army in 1545 and has disappeared from the map.  

The origin of the Rutherford name is thought to have been the Old English "rother" meaning “cattle” and "ford", “a river crossing.”

Or according to another theory, the name can be traced back to the West Flemish name Ruddervoorde, a community now part of Oostkamp. 

Another theory of the origin of the name states that a man by the name Ruther carried an ancient king of Scots over the River Tweed. Eventually, a descendant of the king gave land to the family that carried his forefather over the river and when surnames were adopted, Rutherford came into being.

Surname
Notable people with the surname include:
 Adam Rutherford, British geneticist, author, and broadcaster
 Alexander Cameron Rutherford, Canadian politician, first Premier of Alberta (1905–1910)
 Ann Rutherford (1917–2012), Canadian-American actress, best known as Polly Benedict of Andy Hardy film series
 Anna Rutherford (1932–2001), Australian-born academic and publisher
 Boyd Rutherford (born 1957), Lieutenant Governor of the U.S. state of Maryland
 Carl Rutherford (1929–2006), American Piedmont blues musician
 Clancy Rudeforth, former Australian rules footballer
 Daniel Rutherford, a Scottish chemist and physician who is most famous for the discovery of nitrogen
 Daniel Edwin Rutherford, Scottish mathematician
 Don Rutherford (1937–2016), English international rugby union player
 Ernest Rutherford, 1st Baron Rutherford of Nelson, known as the "father of nuclear physics"
 Frances Rutherford (1912–2006), New Zealand artist and occupational therapist
 Friend Smith Rutherford (1820-1864), United States Army office and lawyer
 Gilbert Rutherford, American politician
 Greg Rutherford (born 1986), British athlete (specifically long jumper)
 Griffith Rutherford (1721-1805) American Revolutionary War General
 Jack Rutherford (cricketer), Australian Test cricketer
 Jack Rutherford (footballer, born 1892) (1892–1930), English footballer for Brighton & Hove Albion, Bristol Rovers and Gillingham
 Jack Rutherford (footballer, born 1908), English footballer for Gillingham and Watford 
 James Rutherford (disambiguation), several people
 Jim Rutherford, former NHL goaltender and current general manager of the Pittsburgh Penguins.
 Joe Rutherford, an Aston Villa F.C. goalkeeper of the mid-20th-century
 John Rutherford (disambiguation), multiple people
 Joseph Franklin Rutherford, also known as "Judge Rutherford", 2nd president of the Watch Tower Society corporation
 Kelly Rutherford, American actress, most famous for her role as Lily van der Woodsen in the CW teen drama Gossip Girl
 Ken Rutherford (cricketer), New Zealand batsman and captain
 Margaret Rutherford, British actress
 Mike Rutherford (born 1950), English musician famous for being the bassist and guitarist of the rock band Genesis 
 Rachel Rutherford, New York City Ballet soloist
 Robert William Rutherford (1857-1933), military and artist
 Rosemary Rutherford (1912–1972), English artist
 Samuel Rutherford (–1661), Scottish theologian, minister and political theorist
 Samuel Rutherford (Georgia politician) (1870-1932), American politician, businessman, jurist and lawyer
 Samuel Wilson Rutherford (1866-1952), African American pioneer in insurance
 Skip Rutherford (born 1950), academic administrator
 Theodora Fonteneau Rutherford (1904-after 1982), American accountant, clubwoman, and college instructor
 Walter Rutherford (1857–1913), Scottish golfer (Olympic silver medallist)
 Walter Rutherford (footballer) (1891–1944), Scottish footballer with Kilmarnock, Ayr United, Johnstone
 William Rutherford (disambiguation), several people
 Zara Rutherford (born 2003), Belgian-British aviator

Given name
Notable people with the given name include:
 Rutherford H. Adkins (1924–1998), World War II pilot with the Tuskegee Airmen
 Rutherford Alcock (1809–1897), British diplomatic representative
 Rutherford Aris (1929–2005), chemical engineer, control theorist, mathematician, professor
 Rutherford Boyd (1882–1951), American sculptor, painter and illustrator
 Rutherford Cravens, American actor 
 Rutherford Decker (1904–1972), American politician
 Rutherford John Gettens (1900–1974), chemist and conservation scientist
 Rutherford Guthrie (1899–1990), Australian politician
 Rutherford B. Hayes (1822–1893), 19th president of the United States (1877–1881)
 Rutherford P. Hayes (1858–1927), American librarian; son of the president
 Rutherford Irones (1877–1948), American physician and politician
 Rutherford Latham (born 1954), Spanish equestrian
 Rutherford George Montgomery (1894–1985), American writer of children's books
 Rutherford Page (1887–1912), early American aviator who died in an airplane crash
 Rutherford Platt (1894–1975), American nature writer, photographer, and advertising executive
 Rutherford "Rud" Rennie (1897–1956), newspaperman and sportswriter
 Rutherford Ness Robertson (1913–2001), Australian botanist and biologist
 Rutherford Waddell (1850–1932), New Zealand Presbyterian minister, social reformer and writer
 Rutherford Lester Whiting (1930–2014), Canadian politician

See also
 Edward Rutherfurd, nom de plume of Francis Edward Wintle, author of historical fiction

References

Surnames of Lowland Scottish origin
English-language surnames